In Whyte notation, 2-4-4-2 refers to a railroad steam locomotive that has two leading wheels followed by four coupled driving wheels, a second set of four coupled driving wheels, and two trailing wheels.

Equivalent classifications
Other equivalent classifications are:
UIC classification: 1BB1 (also known as German classification and Italian classification)
French classification: 120+021
Turkish classification: 23+23
Swiss classification: 2/3+2/3

The UIC classification is refined to (1'B)B1' for a Mallet locomotive.

US Examples
This articulated wheel arrangement was rare in North America; example was the Mallet locomotive.  Most were built as logging locomotives, presumably to better negotiate the uneven (and often temporary) trackwork that characterized such operations.  The added mechanical complexity was found to be of limited value, as reflected in their modest production and use.

There is one known surviving example: The Deep River Logging No. 7 "Skookum" (former Little River No. 126), built by Baldwin Locomotive Works in June 1909. It was retired and abandoned in place in the forest following a derailment wreck in 1955. As of January 2023, it has been restored to operating condition following a 15 year rebuild at the Oregon Coast Scenic Railroad shop in Garibaldi, Oregon. The engine currently resides at the Niles Canyon Railway in Sunol California.

New Zealand

ALCO Number 7
Built by ALCO, this locomotive is a Mallet Compound engine, built for the Taupo Totara Timber Co for use on their 51-mile private tramway system, the Mokai Tramway between Putāruru and Mokai in the North Island. It is now preserved on the Glenbrook Vintage Railway, near Auckland, New Zealand and now carries the number 4. The engine is currently out of service awaiting overhaul, but can still be seen at the railway's Pukeoware workshops.

References 

 
44,2-4-4-2